Dunckerocampus boylei (broad-banded pipefish) is a species of marine fish of the family Syngnathidae. It is found in the Red Sea, Mauritius, and Indonesia, but it is thought to be widespread throughout the Indian Ocean. It feeds on small crustaceans that grow on other fish species. This species is ovoviviparous, with males carrying eggs and giving birth to live young. The specific name honours Bill Boyle, an underwater fish photographer who drew the attention of Kuiter to the species.

References

Further reading

Encyclopedia of Life
iNaturalist

boylei
Marine fish
Fish described in 1998